Lokesh Productions, based in Bengaluru, Karnataka, is an Indian production company best known for making non-fiction shows in the Kannada language. It was founded in 2013 by Girija Lokesh and Srujan Lokesh, wife and son of veteran Kannada actor Lokesh, son of Subbaiah Naidu, who was credited as the first hero of Kannada silent movies. The production house has produced several successful shows on television including Challenge, Chota Champion, and Kaasige Toss, all being reality shows. Currently, the house produces Majaa Talkies, a sketch comedy show which has been a huge hit among the Kannada audience.

Productions

References

Film production companies based in Bangalore
Television production companies of India
Indian companies established in 2013
2013 establishments in Karnataka
Mass media companies established in 2013